James T. Norris was an American politician from Maryland. He served as a member of the Maryland House of Delegates, representing Harford County, in 1922.

Career
Norris was a Democrat. He served as a member of the Maryland House of Delegates, representing Harford County, in 1922.

References

Year of birth missing
Place of birth missing
Year of death missing
People from Harford County, Maryland
Democratic Party members of the Maryland House of Delegates